In enzymology, a riboflavin phosphotransferase is an enzyme that catalyzes the chemical reaction

alpha-D-glucose 1-phosphate + riboflavin  D-glucose + FMN

Thus, the two substrates of this enzyme are alpha-D-glucose 1-phosphate and riboflavin, whereas its two products are D-glucose and FMN.

This enzyme belongs to the family of transferases, specifically those transferring phosphorus-containing groups (phosphotransferases) with an alcohol group as acceptor.  The systematic name of this enzyme class is alpha-D-glucose-1-phosphate:riboflavin 5'-phosphotransferase. Other names in common use include riboflavine phosphotransferase, glucose-1-phosphate phosphotransferase, G-1-P phosphotransferase, and D-glucose-1-phosphate:riboflavin 5'-phosphotransferase.

References

 

EC 2.7.1
Enzymes of unknown structure